Volodymyr Andriyovych Savoshko (born 25 May 1995) is a Ukrainian professional footballer who plays as an attacking midfielder for Ukrainian club Feniks Pidmonastyr.

Personal life
His brother Oleksandr Savoshko is also a professional footballer.

References

External links
 Profile on Podillya Khmelnytskyi official website
 

1995 births
Living people
Sportspeople from Lviv
Ukrainian footballers
Association football midfielders
FC Karpaty Lviv players
FC Lviv players
FC Nyva Vinnytsia players
FC Kalush players
FC Polissya Zhytomyr players
FC Podillya Khmelnytskyi players
Ukrainian First League players
Ukrainian Second League players
Ukrainian expatriate footballers
Expatriate footballers in Austria
Ukrainian expatriate sportspeople in Austria